Jan Dowling (born September 26, 1980) is a Canadian-born American college golf coach and former amateur golfer.  Dowling is the head coach of the Michigan Wolverines women's golf team and previously served as the head coach of the Florida Gators women's golf team of the University of Florida.

Early life and education 

Dowling was born in Newmarket, Ontario, Canada, and grew up in Bradford, Ontario.  She graduated from Kent State University in Kent, Ohio with her bachelor's degree in leisure studies in 2002.  She competed for the Kent State Golden Flashes women's golf team, earning four varsity letters.

Playing career 

During her collegiate playing career at Kent State University, Dowling was recognized as Mid-American Conference Player of the Year in 2000. She won the 2000 Canadian Women's Amateur. After graduation, she was also a member of the Canadian national team for the 2002 World Golf Amateur Championships and was a member of the Ontario Amateur Team in 1999.  She also played professionally from 2003 to 2005 and competed on the Golf Channel show The Big Break.

Coaching career 
The University Athletic Association (UAA) announced its hiring of Dowling as the new head coach of the Florida Gators women's golf team on June 15, 2009.  Dowling previously served as the assistant coach for the Duke University women's golf program for the 2008–2009 season, and three seasons as the women's assistant golf coach at Kent State University from 2006 to 2008.

In her first season as Florida's new head coach, Dowling's Lady Gators finished tenth of twelve teams at the Southeastern Conference (SEC) championship tournament in Tuscaloosa, Alabama, and eleventh of twenty-four teams at the NCAA East Regional Tournament in Greenville, North Carolina.  In her second year as the Lady Gators' coach, the team showed remarkable advancement, finishing as the tenth best women's college team in the country in the NCAA championship tournament.

Dowling became head coach of the University of Michigan's women's golf team in May 2013.

Head coaching record

Women's golf

See also 
 List of Kent State University alumni

References 

1980 births
Living people
Florida Gators women's golf coaches
Kent State Golden Flashes women's golfers
Sportspeople from Newmarket, Ontario